Hex or HEX may refer to:

Magic 
 Hex, a curse or supposed real and potentially supernaturally realized malicious wish
 Hex sign, a barn decoration originating in Pennsylvania Dutch regions of the United States
 Hex work, a Pennsylvania Dutch (German) folk magic system also known as pow-wow

Web colors 
 Hex triplet, a six-digit, three-byte hexadecimal number used in computing applications to represent colors

Engineering and technology 
 Hex key, a tool also known as a hex wrench or Allen wrench, used to drive fasteners
 Hex key, a number sign (#) key on telephones (regional term used in Singapore and Malaysia) 
 High-energy X-rays, sometimes abbreviated "HEX-rays"
 Hexadecimal, a base-16 number system often used in computer nomenclature
 Hexcentric, an item of climbing protection equipment
 Heat exchanger, a device for heat transfer
 Hypersonic Flight Experiment, a planned mission of the Indian Space Research Organisation
 Intel HEX, a computer file format
 Uranium hexafluoride, a compound used in nuclear fuel refinement

Businesses and services 
 Hex'Air, an airline based in southern France
 Heathrow Express, a train service in London
 Helsinki Stock Exchange

Games and sport 
 Hex, a hexagonal tile of a hex map, used in war and strategy board games
 Hex (board game), a mathematical strategy game played on a hexagonal grid or rhombus
 Hex (climbing), an item of rock climbing equipment used to arrest a fall
 Hex (video game), a 1985 computer game for the Amiga and Atari ST
 Hex: Shards of Fate, an MMO trading card game by Cryptozoic Entertainment
 Hex – The Legend of the Towers, a Vekoma Madhouse ride at the Alton Towers Resort, England
 The Hexagonal (CONCACAF), final round of FIFA World Cup qualifiers for North America, Central America, and the Caribbean
 Hex, pseudonym of the puzzle writers Emily Cox and Henry Rathvon
 The Hex, a 2018 computer game by the creator of Pony Island

Places 
 Hex River, a tributary of the Breede River in South Africa
 Hex River, a tributary of the Elands River in South Africa
 Hexham railway station, Northumberland, England

Arts and media

Books 
 Hex (1998 novel), a dystopian novel for young adults by Rhiannon Lassiter
 Hex, a 2011 science fiction novel by Allen Steele
 HEX (2013 novel), a Dutch horror novel by Thomas Olde Heuvelt, published in English in 2016

Fictional characters 
 Hex (Ben 10), a villain in the Ben 10 franchise
 Hex (Discworld), a computer in Terry Pratchett's Discworld novels
 Hex Schofield, a companion of the Seventh Doctor in a series of Doctor Who audio plays
 Hex, an illusionist and escapologist in the Marvel Comics series ClanDestine
 Hex, an undead dark elf necromancer in the Netflix animated series Skylanders Academy
 HEX, an evil organization in the novel InterWorld
 Jonah Hex, a DC Comics character
 The Hex Girls, a fictitious musical group in the Scooby-Doo franchise

Film and television 
 HEX, in WandaVision is a nickname for the city of Westview
 Hex (1973 film), a 1973 film starring Keith Carradine, Gary Busey, Dan Haggerty, and Hillarie Thompson
 Hex, a 1980 Hong Kong film directed by Kuei Chih-Hung
 Hex (2015 film), a 2015 film directed by Clarence Peters
 Hex, a 2018 film directed by Rudolf Buitendach
 Hex (TV series), a 2004–2005 supernatural/horror drama on British television
 Jonah Hex (film), a 2010 film based on a DC Comics character
 Mr. Hex, a 1946 Bowery Boys comedy film
 Stephanie Bendixsen (born 1985), presenter for Australian TV show Good Game, known by the gamertag Hex

Music

Musical artists 
 Hex, an indie rock duo formed in 1988 by Steve Kilbey and Donnette Thayer
 Hex (VJ group), a British-based multimedia group active in the 1990s which later became Hexstatic
 Hex Hector (born 1965), American dance remixer

Songs and albums 
 Hex (Hex album), 1989, by the indie rock duo Hex
 Hex (Bark Psychosis album), 1994
 Hex (Poison Girls album)
 Hex, a 2003 album by the Los Angeles-based rock band Bigelf
 Hex; Or Printing in the Infernal Method, a 2005 album by the band Earth
 "Hex" (song), by Rezz and 1788-L
 "Hex", a 2014 song co-written by Wax Motif and Tommy Trash

See also 
 Hex game (disambiguation)
 Hexes (disambiguation)
 Hexx: Heresy of the Wizard, a 1994 video game
 "The Hexx", a song by the band Pavement